Warner Westenra may refer to:

Warner Westenra (Irish MP) (died 1772), MP for Maryborough
Warner Westenra, 2nd Baron Rossmore (1765–1842), Irish landowner and politician, grandson of the above